The Riddle may refer to:

Music
 The Riddle, a 1959 jazz album by Dave Brubeck
 The Riddle (album), a 1984 rock album by Nik Kershaw
 "The Riddle" (Nik Kershaw song), also covered by many artists including Gigi D'Agostino, and Jack Holiday & Mike Candys
 "The Riddle" (Five for Fighting song), 2006
 "The Riddle", a song in the musical The Scarlet Pimpernel (musical)
 "The Riddle Song", English lullaby also known as "I Gave My Love a Cherry"
 "Tell Me Why (The Riddle)", a 2000 song by Paul van Dyk in collaboration with Saint Etienne
 "The Riddle", a song by Steve Vai on his 1990 album Passion and Warfare

Literature
 The Riddle (novel), a 2004 fantasy book of the Pellinor series by Alison Croggon
 The Riddle (fairy tale), one of Grimm's Fairy Tales
 "The Riddle", a 1923 short story by Walter de la Mare

Film
 The Riddle (film), a 2007 film starring Derek Jacobi

Locations
 The Riddle, Herefordshire, a settlement in England, United Kingdom